The Philippines competed at the 2013 World Games held in Cali, Colombia.

Medalists

Bowling 

Kenneth Chua and Maria Liza del Rosario competed in bowling.

Cue sports 

Dennis Orcollo won the bronze medal in the men's singles event.

Duathlon 

Carlo Pedregosa and Mirasol Abad competed in duathlon. Pedregosa was lapped after finishing the first run of the men's event while Abad was able to complete all races and finished 17th overall. Duathlon was an invitational sport.

References 

Nations at the 2013 World Games
2013 in Philippine sport
2013